Listeria seeligeri is  a Gram-positive, facultatively anaerobic, motile, nonspore-forming, bacillus-shaped species of bacteria.  It is not pathogenic. The species was first isolated from plants, soil, and animal feces in Europe,  was first proposed in 1983, and is named after Heinz P. R. Seeliger. Seeliger first proposed the species L. ivanovii and L. innocua, and published extensively on members of the genus Listeria.

L. seeligeri is one of only three species of Listeria that is hemolytic, along with L. ivanovii and L. monocytogenes.

References

External links
Type strain of Listeria seeligeri at BacDive -  the Bacterial Diversity Metadatabase

seeligeri
Bacteria described in 1983